Beli Potok pri Lembergu is a small settlement in the Municipality of Šmarje pri Jelšah in eastern Slovenia. It lies in the hills north of Lemberg just off the regional road to Poljčane. The area is part of the traditional region of Styria. The municipality is now included in the Savinja Statistical Region.

Name
The name of the settlement was changed from Beli Potok to Beli Potok pri Lembergu in 1953.

References

External links
Beli Potok pri Lembergu at Geopedia

Populated places in the Municipality of Šmarje pri Jelšah